André Cherrier (6 January 1905 – 28 July 1979) was a French athlete. He competed in the men's high jump at the 1928 Summer Olympics.

References

External links
 

1905 births
1979 deaths
Athletes (track and field) at the 1928 Summer Olympics
French male high jumpers
Olympic athletes of France
Athletes from Paris